Henslow or Henslowe is a surname. Notable people with the surname include:

George Henslow (1835–1925), British botanist
John Henslow (Surveyor of the Navy) (1730–1815), naval architect
John Stevens Henslow (1796–1861), botanist, Sir John Henslow's grandson and Charles Darwin's mentor
Francis Hartwell Henslowe (1811–1878), civil servant and composer, grandson of Sir John Henslow
Philip Henslowe (c. 1550 – 1616), Elizabethan theatrical entrepreneur and impresario